Dance Passion is a remix album by Swedish pop music duo Roxette, released on 27 March 1987 by EMI. It consists of remixed versions of tracks from their debut album, Pearls of Passion (1986). The album was only released on vinyl in select European territories, namely Sweden, Germany and Italy. It failed to chart in the latter countries, and sold just 27,000 copies in Sweden, peaking at number 19 and spending four weeks on the Swedish Albums Chart. It has never been reissued or pressed onto cassette or CD.

Songs on the record were predominantly remixed by Swedish producer and engineer Kaj Erixon, with the exception of René Hedemyr's remix of "Neverending Love", and the version of "Secrets That She Keeps", which was created by longtime Roxette engineer Alar Suurna. Two of these remixes had previously been issued on their respective singles: the aforementioned remix of "Neverending Love" appeared under the names "Extended Club Mix" or "Euro Mix" on the 12" single released in France; the remix of "Soul Deep" also featured on that song's 12" single, under the title "Extended Mix". All other remixes are exclusive to this release.

Track listing

Personnel
Credits adapted from the liner notes of Dance Passion.

 Roxette are Per Gessle and Marie Fredriksson
 Originally produced by Clarence Öfwerman at EMI Studios, Stockholm, Sweden
 Remixed by René Hedemyr ("Neverending Love"), Alar Suurna ("Secrets That She Keeps") and Kaj Erixon
 Additional overdubbing by Kent Gillström at The Hit Factory, New York City
 Mastered by Peter Dahl at Polar Studios, Stockholm, Sweden
 All songs published by Jimmy Fun Music, except "Soul Deep" by Happy Accident Music

Musicians
 Vocals — Marie Fredriksson and Per Gessle
 Backing vocals — Marianne Flynner and Anne-Lie Rydé
 Bass guitar — Tommy Cassemar
 Drums — Per "Pelle" Alsing, Per Andersson and Tim Wener
 Electric guitars — Staffan Astner, Jonas Isacsson and Mats "MP" Persson
 Keyboards — Clarence Öfwerman
 Percussion — Mats "MP" Persson
 Trumpet — Uno Forsberg, Mikael Renlinden and Tomas Sjörgen (on "Soul Deep")

Charts

References

Roxette albums
1987 remix albums
EMI Records remix albums